Klair Kalan is a town and union council of Depalpur Tehsil in the Okara District of Punjab Province, Pakistan. The Union council Consists on many villages: Klair Mumhand, Attary, Kanda Bazeedayka, and Kahan Singh, etc. Mian Abdul Ghaffar Khan Wattoo Bazeeday ka Nazam of UC Klair Klan belongs to village of Bazeedayka Famili Klair Mumhand Pakistan.

References

Union councils of Okara District